Louie Giglio (pronounced GIG-leo; born June 30, 1958) is an American Christian pastor. He is the leader of Passion City Church which is located in Atlanta. The founder of the Passion Movement, he is an author and public speaker.

Biography
Giglio was born in Atlanta on June 30, 1958 and is of Italian descent. He grew up in the Atlanta suburb of Smyrna and graduated from Campbell High School. He studied at Georgia State University and earned a Bachelor of Arts, then he studied at Southwestern Baptist Theological Seminary and earned a Master of Theology. Later he went to Grace Theological Seminary to pursue a Doctor of Ministry degree.

Ministry 
After finishing seminary, Giglio and his wife Shelley began a weekly Bible study called Choice at Baylor University where he was doing graduate studies in 1985. After several years over ten percent of the Baylor student body was attending the weekly gathering, and Giglio's heart for the significance of what he refers to as the "university moment" was set.

In 1995, Giglio decided to move from his home in Waco to Atlanta because of his father's failing health, although his father died from a brain infection and a heart attack prior to their arrival in Atlanta. Around that time during a flight from Texas to Georgia, Louie was inspired to start a national gathering of college students, which would later become Passion Conferences. The first Passion Conference was held in 1997 in Austin, Texas with about 2,000 university students in attendance. Since then Passion continues to host annual gatherings in the United States and around the world for college students. Until the founding of Passion City Church, Giglio was a longtime member of North Point Community Church.

In 2000, he founded the record label Sixsteps Records.

Giglio wrote Not Forsaken, Goliath Must Fall, Indescribable: 100 Devotions about God & Science,The Air I Breathe: Worship as a Way of Life, and I Am Not But I Know I Am: Welcome to the Story Of God. Giglio's latest release, Not Forsaken, debuted at number 3 on the Publishers Weekly Trade Paper Frontlist, and ranked number 6 on the May 2019 Religion Nonfiction bestsellers list. His previous trade release, Goliath Must Fall, made the Publishers Weekly bestseller list in May 2017  and was #31 in the list of the top 100 bestselling Christian books of 2017.

Controversies 
On January 11, 2013, Giglio withdrew from the second Obama inauguration at which he was due to deliver a benediction after it became known in a sermon he delivered in the 1990s he urged Christians to oppose the "aggressive agenda" of the gay rights movement. He described homosexuality as a "sin in the eyes of God, and it is sin in the word of God".

In a conversation about racism with Chick-fil-A CEO Dan Cathy and rapper Lecrae in June 2020, Giglio suggested that Americans replace the phrase "white privilege" with "white blessing". He said that the "blessing of slavery" had built up the framework for the world that white people live in. Giglio issued an apology on Twitter for his comments.

Writings
 
 
  - a version of The Air I Breathe

References

External links
 Passion City Church
 268generation - Web site for Passion Conferences
 sixstepsrecords - Home of Crowder, Sean Curran, Kristian Stanfill, and Passion.
 louiegiglio.com - Louie Giglio official website

1958 births
Living people
American male non-fiction writers
Baptist ministers from the United States
Baptist writers
Baylor University alumni
Southern Baptists
Georgia State University alumni
Southwestern Baptist Theological Seminary alumni
Grace Theological Seminary alumni